Suad (Arabic: سعاد su‘ad) and the variants Souad, Soad, stems from the Arabic verb sa‘ada (سَعَدَ - 'to be happy, fortunate or lucky') which the name means "good luck, good fortune, happiness, auspicious, prosperous, favorable". Suad is another variant from the Arabic given name Saad.

Generally, the name is originally a female given name, however, men also use it as a given name. 

Suad is also the name of a tribe and the Arabic name of an ancient deity. 

The name which may refer to:

Given name

Souad
 Souad, the author of Burned Alive
 Souad Abderrahim, Tunisian politician
 Souad Abdullah (born 1950), Kuwaiti actress
 Souad Aït Salem (born 1979), Algerian long-distance runner
 Souad Amidou (born 1959), French actress
 Souad Bendjaballah, Algerian lawyer, activist for women's rights and politician
 Souad Cherouati (born 1989), Algerian swimmer
 Souad Dibi, Moroccan feminist activist
 Souad Dinar (born 1977), French weightlifter
 Souad Faress (born 1948), Ghanaian, British stage, radio, television and film actress of Syrian descent
 Souad Massi (born 1972), Algerian singer
 Souad Mekhennet (born 1978), German journalist
 Souad Nawfal, Syrian schoolteacher and activist 
 Souad Oulhaj (born 1974), Moroccan football referee
 Souad Titou (born 1986), Algerian handball player
 Souad (film), an Egyptian film

Soad
Soad Fezzani, Libyan swimmer
Soad Hosny (1943–2001), Egyptian actress and singer
Suad Nasr (1953–2007), Egyptian actress

Suad
Suad Amiry (born 1951), Palestinian author and architect
Suad al-Attar (born 1942), Iraqi painter 
Suad Beširević (born 1963), Slovenian footballer and football manager of Bosnian origin
Suad Fileković (born 1978), Slovenian footballer
Suad Gruda (born 1991), Swedish and Montenegrin footballer
Suad Joseph (born 1943), American anthropologist of Lebanese origin
Suad Kalesić (born 1954), Bosnian footballer 
Suad Nasr (1953–2007), Egyptian stage, television, and film actress
Suad Nokić (born 1993), Serbian-Bosniak footballer
Suad Sahiti (born 1995), Kosovo Albanian professional footballer
Suad Salih, Egyptian comparative fiqh professor at Al-Azhar University
Suad Šehović (born 1987), Montenegrin basketball player
Suad Al-Shammari, Saudi Arabian women's rights activist
Suad Švraka (1927–1995), Bosnian and Yugoslav footballer
Suad Zeljković (born 1960), Bosnian politician who served as the Prime Minister of the Sarajevo Canton, one of Bosnia and Herzegovina's ten cantons

Surname
 Mohamed Abdou El-Souad (born 1968), Egyptian pentathlete

See also
Soad (disambiguation)

Arabic unisex given names
Arabic-language surnames